The KW-1b Quero Quero (Brazilian name for the southern lapwing bird) is a sailplane that was produced in Brazil in the 1970s and 1980s. It is a conventional, single seat design of wooden construction. The undercarriage is a fixed monowheel, and construction is of wood (freijó and plywood) throughout.

Development

The original KW-1a prototype, designed and constructed by Kuno Widmaier, first flew in 1969.
At the time CTA (Brazilian Aviation Authority at the time) was looking for a new sailplane of Brazilian design to re-equip the Aeroclubs. Other types were considered, but the good results achieved by Widmaier called attention of the selection group.

IPE started the process of adaptations required for certification and assembly production: taller cockpit, redesigned nose, and enlarged rudder, it achieved Brazilian certification in December 1976 and was produced by IPE (Indústria Paranaense de Estruturas) under contract by the Brazilian Government. 156 units were produced and supplied to Brazilian flying clubs. Many soaring records were established with the type (Kw-1 Records), which is commonly used as the first solo type during flight training. As of 2017 it still is the most numerous glider type in Brazil.

Variants

After certification, about four different variants were developed: two variants by IPE, and two from independent initiatives.

Quero Quero II
Developed by IPE with different vertical and horizontal tail, and retractable wheel. At least one built.

Quero Quero GB
Developed by Eng. Francisco Leme Galvao, and built by IPE, the GB had a different nose, winglets, laminar profile and retractable wheel. Two Built with registration PP-ZUM and PP-ZUN.

Falcon
In 1978, Wolfram Gabler and his father Ebehard Gabler, developed from a Kw-1 fuselage a modified version with a different wing profile, new wing-tips, and cockpit. The construction of the new version took place at his father's living room, taking 5600 working hours.

The maiden flight took place on October 15, 1982, flow by Wolfram Gabler at Palmeira das Missoes, Brazil.
The variant was very successful in soaring contests, having won 3 championships. Only a single unit was built.

Super Quero Quero
Developed independently, with a new cockpit, wing plan-form, vertical tail, and fixed mono wheel. At least two built.

Specifications

See also

References
 
 
 
 
 

Notes

External links

1960s Brazilian civil aircraft
1960s Brazilian sailplanes
Aircraft first flown in 1969
High-wing aircraft